The History of Gold Coast and Asante  is a preserved work of oral tradition by Carl Christian Reindorf (1834–1917) and considered a pioneering work and a "historical classic" and entirely written in English and Ga language. He completed his work in 1889 and published in 1895 in Basel.

Background 
The work was a full-length Western-style history of a region in Africa by the first African that was published. The work was inspired by the publishing work of his colleague Johann Gottlieb Christaller in preserving oral tradition. J. G. Christaller during his time in Ghana in the third quarter of the nineteenth century worked on extensively on oral tradition. In preserving an oral tradition, the history of Gold Coast and Asante won a permanent place in the annals of African history.

Synopsis 
The book has 29 chapters arranged chronologically.The book covers the period  BC600-750 and AD1400-1700 with short description of " Gold Coast; the Kingdom of Guinea; expeditions sent by Pharaoh Necho and the Carthiginians; F. Romber’s reference to the Kingdom of Benin; traditional accounts of emigration to the coast; tribes assumed to have been the aboriginal races on the coast, and their conquest".

The final chapter covers the period 1851-1856 : "administration of justice according to English law & its effects; imposition & collection methods of a poll tax, and conspiracy to refuse payment; bombardment of Christiansborg, Labadi and Teshi; peace and the rebuilding of Christiansborg."

Purpose 
The purpose of the book as stated by the author ;

 Need for such history by a Ghanaian
 conscious of the customs and tradition of Ghana.

Significance 

The customs and their usage in the book are relevant to interpretation of Law as an authority in the Law Courts of Ghana.

Editions

References 

1895 non-fiction books
History of Ghana